Touch is  an American drama television series that ran on Fox from January 25, 2012, to May 10, 2013. The series was created by Tim Kring and starred Kiefer Sutherland. During its first season the series aired regularly on Thursday nights beginning March 22, 2012. Thirteen episodes were ordered for the first season, with the two-episode season finale airing on Thursday, May 31, 2012. On May 9, 2012, Fox renewed the show for a second season. The second season was originally scheduled to begin Friday, October 26, 2012, but was pushed back to Friday, February 8, 2013.

On May 9, 2013, Fox canceled the series after two seasons.

Plot
Touch centers on former reporter Martin Bohm (Kiefer Sutherland) and his 11-year-old son, Jake (David Mazouz), who has been diagnosed as autistic. Martin's wife died in the World Trade Center during the September 11 attacks, and he has been struggling to raise Jake since then, moving from job to job while tending to Jake's special needs. Jake has never spoken a word, but is fascinated by numbers and patterns relating to numbers, spending much of his days writing them down in notebooks or his touch-screen tablet and sometimes using objects (for instance popcorn kernels).

Season 1
Jake's repeated escapes from special schools put Martin's capacity to raise the child in question, and social worker Clea Hopkins (Gugu Mbatha-Raw) arrives to perform an evaluation of Jake's living conditions. Martin, worried that he might lose his son, attempts to communicate with him, but the boy only continues to write down a specific pattern of numbers. This leads Martin to discover Professor Arthur Teller (Danny Glover), who has seen and worked with cases like this before, claiming that Jake is one of the few who can see the "pain of the universe" through the numbers. Teller also alludes to the interconnectivity of humanity as envisioned by the Chinese legend of the red string of fate, whereby actions, seen and unseen, can change the fate of people across the globe for the better. Martin realizes that Jake is trying to tell him to follow the numbers. On subsequent days, Martin does as Jake wants, each time finding his actions improving those touched by the numbers, though his devotion to following Jake's message puts his evaluation with social services at risk.

A larger overarching plot involves Teller's work. Teller himself had seen the numbers during a stroke and has been fascinated with them since. The sequence of numbers that Jake presents falls into what Teller claimed was the Amelia Sequence (later known as the God Sequence), based on Amelia Robbins, who was one of his former child patients. Teller later is found dead after attempting to locate Amelia at the same facility where Jake spends his days. Martin discovers Teller's old office, rented out from a Jewish synagogue, where he had been performing further research on the Amelia Sequence. He also learns that Teller's office mate, Avram (Bodhi Elfman), recognizes Jake as one of the 36 Righteous Ones. Meanwhile, Clea learns that an organization called Aster Corps, which provides Jake's school with modern equipment, seems intent on studying Jake's abilities as well as having ties to Teller's previous work with Amelia. When Aster Corps attempts to force the state to relinquish Martin's custody rights, Martin, with Clea's help, is able to sneak Jake out and leave the city. Through Jake's directions, they end up meeting Amelia's mother, Lucy (Maria Bello), on a pier in Los Angeles.

Season 2
Martin, Jake, and Lucy gain help in their quest from news syndicate BreakWire and its owner, Trevor Wilcox (Greg Ellis). Jake starts to talk to Amelia (Saxon Sharbino) in their telepathic world. They also encounter Calvin Norburg (Lukas Haas), a former Aster Corps genius who is trying to heal his brain-damaged brother, and a murderous former priest, Guillermo Ortiz (Saïd Taghmaoui), who is determined to eliminate all of the Righteous 36 in order to restore the natural order of the universe, with God on top. After Lucy is killed on the orders of Aster Corps CEO Nicole Farington (Frances Fisher), Martin discovers that Farington plans to capture Jake and Amelia in order to decipher the God Sequence and use its predictive qualities to save the failing company.

The season ends with Amelia (Saxon Sharbino) losing her special powers and Jake being secretly marked as the special one of the 36 by the rabbi. Calvin loses his sick brother after all his efforts, and Martin becomes the sole protector of the 36. The God Sequence is finally fully revealed.

Cast and characters

Main 

 Kiefer Sutherland as Martin Bohm: a former journalist turned baggage handler, whose wife died in the September 11 attacks.
 David Mazouz as Jacob "Jake" Bohm: Martin's mute 11-year-old son, who is obsessed with numbers and can see past, present and future events through numbers, and shows his father the numbers so that his father can help stop bad events from happening
 Gugu Mbatha-Raw as Clea Hopkins (season 1): a social worker who is sent to do an evaluation of the Bohms' living situation, and helps Martin and Jake escape from New York.
 Danny Glover as Professor Arthur Teller (season 1): an expert on the gifted few who possess numerical clairvoyance.
 Maria Bello (season 2; guest, season 1) as Lucy Robbins: the mother of Amelia, a girl who shares a gift similar to that of Jake and former client of Teller. 
 Saxon Sharbino as Amelia Robbins (season 2): Lucy's missing daughter, who is gifted like Jake. 
 Lukas Haas as Calvin Norburg (season 2): an Aster Corps genius whose path crosses with Martin and Jake. He is researching Amelia's brain activity, and plans to use the data to help his brain-damaged brother, William, recover from a major accident that he caused.  
 Saïd Taghmaoui as Guillermo Ortiz (season 2): a priest-turned-murderer bent on killing the 36 people with Jake's ability, though he is one himself. When finally cornered by Martin, he kills himself rather than be captured, but not before apologizing to God (within earshot of Martin) for not finding the "nest of seven."

Recurring cast 
 Bodhi Elfman as Avram Hadar: a Hasidic Jew who shares an office with Teller. A student of Kabbalah, Avram believes Jake's special abilities are tied to this mysticism.
 Frances Fisher as Nicole Farington: CEO of Aster Corps who tries to decipher the God Sequence in order to predict the future to the advantage of Aster Corps.
 Mykelti Williamson as Detective Lange: an LAPD detective who believes Martin's story enough to investigate Aster Corps.
 Adam Campbell as Anthony "Tony" Rigby: an Aster Corps executive who reports to Farington and is complicit in keeping Amelia away from her mother.
 Leland Orser as Dr. Linus: an Aster Corps employee in charge of the dangerous experiments being conducted on select members of the 36 at Aster Corps' Sleep Assessment Center. The experiments are disguised as treatment for sleep disorders, but are actually being used to complete the predictive number sequence for Aster Corps.
 D. B. Sweeney as Joseph Tanner: Aster Corps enforcer who works directly under Farington orders.
 Titus Welliver as Randall Meade: New York Lottery winner and a former firefighter who tried to rescue Martin's wife in the September 11 attacks. Meade believes he has a task to fulfill to atone for Sarah Bohm's death, which is driven by "his" numbers.
 Roxana Brusso as Sheri Strepling: the corrupt director of the board-and-care facility that Jake attended.  
 Catherine Dent as Abigail Kelsey: Jake's aunt and an Aster Corps executive seeking custody of Jake.
 Linda Gehringer as Frances Norburg: Calvin's mother, a middle-school librarian who is called to be Amelia's handler after the girl is kidnapped. She is murdered under orders from Aster Corps.
 Samantha Whittaker as Dr. Nell Plimpton: an archaeologist and one of the 36 who comes to Los Angeles to Aster Corps' Sleep Assessment Center.
 May Miyata and Satomi Okuno as Miyoko and Izumi: Flamboyant Japanese friends whose online presence runs throughout the first season, beginning with a cellular telephone that they receive from an international journey.
 Greg Ellis (season 2) as Trevor Wilcox: Martin's former reporter rival and later a friend who now owns a news syndicate called BreakWire and becomes an ally. Martin often leaves Jake under his care.

Production
Touch season one was shot at The Culver Studios in Culver City, California, and on location in Los Angeles. Season two was filmed at Fox Studios in Century City, Los Angeles.

Post-production
"Three Little Birds", sung by Kayla Graham (Karen David), was released as a soundtrack single, on iTunes by 20th Century Fox TV Records on February 28, 2012.

Episodes

Season 1 (2012)

Season 2 (2013)

International broadcast

Reception

Critical reception
The first season of the show was met with "generally favorable" reviews, and obtained a Metacritic score of 63/100. The second season received "mixed or average" reviews with a Metacritic score of 60/100.

Michael Landweber of PopMatters called the first episode  "stunningly effective", and said that "its mix of spirituality and science, familial and global struggles, is galvanising." He also noted that "The boy's narration, unnervingly matter-of-fact about the nature of the universe, takes on more power when he reveals that in 11 years, he has never spoken a word." In a review for the New York Post, Linda Stasi said "If you can't get enough of number sequences and universal cylindrical patterns that constantly repeat [...] then for sure you'll repeat the pattern of watching Fox's new show." She added, "Yes, the show is intriguing, and it's great to have Sutherland back on TV. But frankly, it's awfully complicated." Lori Rackl of the Chicago Sun-Times said the show "operates on the mind-blowing premise that people around the world are linked to one another and their lives intersect—with potentially major repercussions". She finished the review saying it "delivers a suspenseful ride around the world, peppered with some tear-jerking moments. The bar has been set high. Here's hoping "Touch" continues to reach it." Kiefer Sutherland's performance also gained praise, with Landweber saying "Sutherland, however, plays the part with such a combination of intensity and subtlety that we are drawn deep into Martin's suffering, and rather than judging him, we feel with him. Every trial is etched in his face. He imbued Jack Bauer with similar stoicism, but Martin seems less resilient, more distressed."

Verne Gay of Newsday called the second season "more fun," adding "you have plain old smashmouth elemental TV story devices—good guys, bad guys, evil corporations, a family unit, and a headlong rush toward the Truth, whatever that may be." The New York Times Neil Genzlinger called the season "considerably darker and more complex," adding "The intricacies may make it harder for new viewers to crack the show without doing some catch-up watching, but they also make it far more absorbing." David Hinckley of the Daily News found two problems with the second season—"characters like popups in a video game" and "as the action ramps up, Jake's gift recedes." He added, "The show still has some interesting things happening, and there are worse things on TV than a fast-paced action drama."

Ratings
Touch debuted to over 12 million viewers in the pilot episode, with the next episode pulling in more than 11.8 million.  But ratings fell sharply after that, and the season one finale garnered just 4.6 million viewers.  After the first two episodes of season two, all of the remaining 11 episodes fell short of 3 million viewers, leading to the series cancellation.

Accolades

References

External links

2010s American drama television series
2012 American television series debuts
2013 American television series endings
English-language television shows
Fox Broadcasting Company original programming
Mathematics and culture
Television series by 20th Century Fox Television
Television shows set in New York City
Television shows set in Los Angeles
Television series created by Tim Kring
Autism in television
Television series by Chernin Entertainment